Adam Chase may refer to:
Stephen Marlowe, American author who uses Adam Chase as a pseudonym
Adam Chase (writer),  TV writer and producer